Apple One is a subscription which bundles a number of premium services provided by Apple Inc. into tiered packages, first offered in late 2020. The three tiers offered are Individual, Family, and Premier, with all three providing access to Apple Music, Apple TV+, Apple Arcade, and iCloud storage (50 GB for Individual, 200 GB for Family, and 2TB for Premier). The Premier tier also includes Apple News+ and Apple Fitness+. Both family and premier packages allow family sharing for up to six people. Additional iCloud Storage can be purchased on top of an Apple One subscription.

Description
Apple One was announced on September 15, 2020, during the Apple Event and later launched globally on October 30. Plans for a services bundle had been in development at Apple for years, as part of the company's efforts to increase its revenue from services and decrease its reliance on hardware sales.

The subscription groups premium services provided by Apple Inc. into tiered packages. The three tiers offered are Individual, Family, and Premier, with all three providing access to Apple Music, Apple TV+, Apple Arcade, and iCloud storage (50 GB for Individual, 200 GB for Family, and 2TB for Premier). The Premier tier also includes Apple News+ and Apple Fitness+. Both family and premier packages allow family sharing for up to six people. Additional iCloud storage can be purchased at the top of an Apple One subscription.

Apple One subscription bundles are designed to entice users into other services which they might not otherwise have considered subscribing to, such as Apple Arcade or Apple News+, by providing them together at a discounted price. 

According to Apple, a user who would intend to pay for each component service contained in the Individual bundle would save roughly $6 monthly by instead paying for Apple One at the Individual tier, while under the same premise, a Family tier subscriber would save $8 per month and a Premier tier subscriber roughly $25 per month.

On August 13, 2020, Apple announced that it would make the service available to users around the world in October.

Price increases
On October 24, 2022, Apple announced it was to increase pricing of Apple One (along with Apple Music and Apple TV+) subscriptions in many regions. The Individual plan increased $2 to $16.95/month, the Family plan increased $3 to $22.95/month, and the Premium plan increased $3 to $32.95/month.

Reception
The Verge has compared the service to Amazon Prime, through its bundling of Amazon Prime Video and Amazon Music. CNET noted that the service's biggest draw is its inclusion of iCloud services.

Competitor Response 
Spotify has raised concerns that Apple may be exploiting a dominant position, claiming that Apple One puts competitors at a disadvantage as consumers are favoured for using Apple's own services over alternatives, due to Apple's control of the iOS platform. Spotify called on competition regulators to act because they believe the practice should be seen as anti-competitive behaviour and as such should be subject to restrictions and regulation.

See also
 Pixel Pass

References

Apple Inc. services
Subscription services